Bridge Headquarters was a group of contract bridge experts organized in the early 1930s.

The group was organized in July 1931. The Bridge Headquarters was organized as a formal corporation under that name. Representing bridge's "old guard", it stood in opposition to Ely Culbertson's bidding system, and with a stated purpose of standardizing bridge bidding and play. To that end, the twelve members created a system it called the Official System.

Culbertson engaged in a war of words against the Bridge Headquarters, culminating in a 1931-1932 challenge match, the so-called "Bridge Battle of the Century", Culbertson and partners against Bridge Headquarters member Sidney Lenz and partners. Lenz lost, and the Official System was eventually superseded by other systems. However, Milton Work's point-count system, an important component of the Official System (and which stood in contrast to Culbertson's more cumbersome honor-count system), constituted the basis of Charles Goren's system which became by far the most popular system for the second half of the 20th century.

Members
Sidney Lenz
Milton Work
Wilbur Whitehead
Edward Valentine Shepard
George Reith
and seven others

References

Further reading
"Differences between the Culberston and Official Systems" (Truscott & Truscott 2004, p. 50.)

Contract bridge organizations